Sekou Camara (born 16 April 1961) is a Guinean judoka. He competed in the men's half-middleweight event at the 1992 Summer Olympics.

References

1961 births
Living people
Guinean male judoka
Olympic judoka of Guinea
Judoka at the 1992 Summer Olympics
Place of birth missing (living people)